Mezzana Rabattone is a comune (municipality) in the Province of Pavia in the Italian region Lombardy, located about  south of Milan and about  southwest of Pavia.

It is part of the lower Lomellina in the Po River valley, near its confluence with the Terdoppio.

References

Cities and towns in Lombardy